= Football positions =

Football positions may refer to:

- American football positions
- Association football positions
- Australian rules football positions
- Rugby league positions
- Rugby union positions
